Hikaru Kosaka (born 21 October 1988) is a Japanese cyclo-cross and road cyclist, who currently rides for UCI Continental team . He represented his nation in the men's elite event at the 2016 UCI Cyclo-cross World Championships in Heusden-Zolder.

Major results

2010–2011
 3rd Makino
2012–2013
 2nd National Championships
2013–2014
 2nd National Championships
 3rd Yasu
2014–2015
 2nd Makino
 3rd National Championships
2015–2016
 1st Inawashiro
 2nd Makino
 2nd Rapha Nobeyama Supercross
 3rd National Championships
2016–2017
 1st Sagae
 2nd Makino
 1st Rapha Supercross Nobeyama Day 1
 3rd National Championships
2017–2018
 1st  National Championships
 Tohoku CX Series
1st Makino
1st Sagae
 1st Toride
2018–2019
 Tohoku CX Series
1st ZAO-sama Cup
1st Sagae
 2nd Starlight-cross
 2nd Toride
 3rd National Championships
2019–2020
 Tohoku CX Series
1st ZAO-sama Cup
2nd Sagae
 3rd National Championships
 3rd Kansai
 3rd Utsunomiya Day 1
 3rd Yowamushi-Pedal Makuhari Cross
2021–2022
 1st  National Championships
 2nd Kansai Grand Prix
 3rd Rapha Supercross Nobeyama

References

External links
 

1988 births
Living people
Cyclo-cross cyclists
Japanese male cyclists